James Elfyn Edwards (born 4 May 1960) is a Welsh former professional footballer, who was most recently an academy coach  side Tamworth, during his playing career he played as a central defender in the Football League for Tranmere Rovers.

Playing career

Tranmere Rovers
Edwards began his career at Tranmere Rovers.

Coaching career

Tamworth
Since his retirement from playing, Edwards moved to Sutton Coldfield, and is now coaching the academy at Tamworth, mainly coaching the U10's and U12's.

References

External links

Tranmere Rovers F.C. players
Wrexham A.F.C. players
Runcorn F.C. Halton players
Altrincham F.C. players
Bangor City F.C. players
Macclesfield Town F.C. players
Halifax Town A.F.C. players
Southport F.C. players
Winsford United F.C. players
Warrington Town F.C. players
Association football central defenders
English Football League players
1960 births
Living people
Footballers from Aberystwyth
Welsh footballers